Senni Nieminen (also known as Senni Lehto, originally Xenia Aleksandra Mäkelä, 21 March 1905 – 28 July 1970) was a Finnish actress. She worked in theatres while also appearing in films and on television.

Selected filmography 

 Miehen vankina (1943)
 Kuisma ja Helinä (1951)
 Omena putoaa (1952)
 Kun on tunteet (1954)
 Elokuu (1956)
 Nuori mylläri (1958)
 Nuoruus vauhdissa (1961)
 Asfalttilampaat (1968)

References

External links 
 

1905 births
1970 deaths
Actors from Turku
People from Turku and Pori Province (Grand Duchy of Finland)
20th-century Finnish actresses